Nephi Moroni Jorgensen (October 23, 1909 – January 11, 1988) was an American football coach and college athletic administrator. He served as the head football coach at Defiance College in Defiance, Ohio from 1939 to 1940. In 1947 Dr. Jorgensen became the first athletic director at  East Carolina Teachers College, which later became East Carolina University .He served in this position until 1963. He was inducted into the first class of the ECU Athletics Hall of Fame in 1974.

Head coaching record

References

External links
 

1909 births
1988 deaths
Defiance Yellow Jackets football coaches
East Carolina Pirates athletic directors
People from Bonneville County, Idaho